Lorri Neilsen Glenn is a Canadian poet, ethnographer, and essayist. Born and raised on the Prairies, she moved to Nova Scotia in 1983. Neilsen Glenn is the author and editor of several books of creative nonfiction, poetry, literacy, ethnography, and essays (scholarly and literary). Her award-winning writing focuses on women, arts-based research, and memoir/life stories; her work is known for its hybrid and lyrical approaches. She has published book reviews in national and international journals and newspapers.

Biography
Her first book of poetry, All the Perfect Disguises, winner of the Poet's Corner Award, was published in 2003. In 2007, a chapbook, Saved String (Rubicon Press) and the  collection Combustion (Brick Books) were published. Neilsen Glenn published 'Lost Gospels' (Brick Books) in 2010. A collection of essays on poetry and loss, Threading Light, was published in 2011 by Hagios Press. The best-selling anthology of poetry and prose about mothers, "Untying the Apron: Daughters Remember Mothers of the 1950s" was published in 2013 by Guernica Editions.

Neilsen Glenn was appointed Poet Laureate for the Halifax Regional Municipality in 2005, a role she held through 2009.  She lives in Halifax, and is Professor Emerita at Mount Saint Vincent University. She serves as a mentor in the University of King's College MFA program in creative nonfiction, and has served as a juror for regional and national writing awards. Neilsen Glenn was President of the Writers' Federation of Nova Scotia from 2020 to 2021 and has served several terms on the organization as board member.

Neilsen Glenn has received numerous awards for her scholarship; her poetry has won or has been shortlisted for the National Magazine Awards, Short Grain Contest,  CBC Literary Awards, Bliss Carman Poetry Award, CV2 Poetry Contest, The Malahat Open Season Award, ReLit Award, among others. Her creative nonfiction has won awards in Grain, Event Magazine, and Prairie Fire. Among her honours are awards for research excellence and innovative teaching (Mount Saint Vincent University) and a Halifax Progress Club Women of Excellence award for her work in the arts.

Neilsen Glenn has taught writing (poetry, creative nonfiction (memoir, the lyric essay, life writing) across Canada, as well as in Ireland, Australia, Chile, and Greece. She has worked extensively with writers in all walks of life since 1983. 

Neilsen Glenn's historical memoir in hybrid form, Following the River: Traces of Red River Women, compiles portraits of her Indigenous grandmothers and their contemporaries in 19th Century Rupertsland / Red River, Manitoba and was published by Wolsak and Wynn in Fall 2017.

Bibliography
 Following the River: Traces of Red River Women,  Wolsak and Wynn, 2017
 Untying the Apron: Daughters Remember Mothers of the 1950s,  Guernica Editions, 2013
 Salt Lines  (Editor, with Carsten Knox), Backalong Books, 2012
 Threading Light Hagios Press, 2011 
 Lost Gospels, Brick Books, 2010
 The Art of Visual Inquiry (co-editor), Backalong Books, 2007
 Saved String, Rubicon Press, 2007
 Combustion, Brick Books, 2007
 Provoked by Art, (co-editor). Backalong Books, 2004
 All the Perfect Disguises, Broken Jaw, 2003
 The Art of Writing Inquiry, (lead editor). Backalong Books, 2001
 Knowing her Place, Caddo Gap, 1998
 A Stone in my Shoe: Literacy in Times of Change, Peguis Publishers, 1992
 Literacy and Living, Heinemann Books, 1989

References

Year of birth missing (living people)
Living people
21st-century Canadian poets
Canadian women poets
21st-century Canadian women writers
Poets Laureate of Halifax, Nova Scotia